Hexamatia is a small genus of Asian dwarf sheet spiders first described by F. A. Rivera-Quiroz, B. Petcharad and J. A. Miller in 2020.  it contains only two species: H. seekhaow and H. senaria.

See also
 Hahnia
 List of Hahniidae species

References

Further reading

Hahniidae genera
Spiders of Asia